Matthew Ruchty (born November 27, 1969) is a Canadian former professional ice hockey left winger. He was drafted by the New Jersey Devils, 65th overall in 1988, but only played two exhibition games in the National Hockey League (NHL). Ruchty was a career minor-leaguer, playing in the American Hockey League (AHL), International Hockey League (IHL), Continental Hockey League (CoHL), West Coast Hockey League (WCHL), United Hockey League (UHL) and ECHL. Although best known for his toughness and accumulation of penalty minutes, as well as his love for The Beatles, Ruchty proved to be an integral part of the Calder Cup-winning Albany River Rats during the 94-95 season, scoring a career-high 49 points in 78 regular season games and notching an additional 15 points in 12 playoff contests.

External links

1969 births
Albany River Rats players
Anchorage Aces players
Atlanta Knights players
B.C. Icemen players
Bowling Green Falcons men's ice hockey players
Canadian ice hockey left wingers
Grand Rapids Griffins players
Ice hockey people from Ontario
Living people
Muskegon Fury players
New Jersey Devils draft picks
Providence Bruins players
Rochester Americans players
Sportspeople from Kitchener, Ontario
Syracuse Crunch players
Toledo Storm players
Utica Blizzard players
Utica Devils players